Scouting in Chile is served by several independent organizations:

 Asociación de Guías y Scouts de Chile; member of the World Association of Girl Guides and Girl Scouts and of the World Organization of the Scout Movement
 Agrupación Nacional de Boy Scouts de Chile; member of the World Federation of Independent Scouts
 Agrupación Hermandad Scout del Desierto; member of the World Federation of Independent Scouts in northern Chile around the town of Antofagasta
 Agrupacion de Escultismo Woodcraft de Chile; member of the Order of World Scouts
 Federacion de Escultismo Chilena; member of the Order of World Scouts
 Unión Scout de Chile; member of the Order of World Scouts
 Federación Nacional de Boy Scouts y Girl Guides Chile; member of the Confederación interamericana de Scouts independientes

Scouting on Easter Island
Scouting also exists on Easter Island, in the Tatauro Mo A Rapa Nui.

Emblems

International Scout units in Chile 
In addition, there are American Boy Scouts in Santiago, linked to the Direct Service branch of the Boy Scouts of America, which supports units around the world, as well as Girl Scouts of the USA.

External links
 Agrupación Hermandad Scout del Desierto
 Agrupación Nacional de Boy Scouts de Chile 
 Agrupacion de Escultismo Woodcraft de Chile (Woodcraft Chile)
 Federacion de Escultismo Chilena
 Unión Scout de Chile
 Federación Nacional de Boy Scouts y Girl Guides Chile